Protector is a horizontally scrolling shooter developed by Bethesda Softworks and published by Songbird Productions for the Atari Jaguar on December 20, 1999. It is based on Søren Grønbech's 1989 Amiga game Datastorm, which in turn it was inspired by both Defender and Dropzone.

When the inhabitants of the planetoid Haven-7 are under attack by a swarm of alien ships, the player is assigned to defend the minor planet and its people from the invasion by taking control of the Starblade spacecraft. Originally completed in 1995, Protector was released months after the Jaguar was declared as an open platform by Hasbro Interactive on the same year it was published. It was the first title released for the system by Songbird Productions.

Protector received positive reception since its release, with critics praising the game's graphics, sound, controls and gameplay, with some considering it superior to Jeff Minter's Defender 2000 but it was, however, criticized for the music by some reviewers and its unbalanced difficulty. Nevertheless, it has been referred by publications like PC Magazine and Retro Gamer as one of the best titles for the system. Due to its popularity, it received both a special edition and an expansion pack for the Atari Jaguar CD in 2002 and 2014 respectively. As of 2019, the special edition has sold over 500 copies, though it is unknown how many copies of the original version have been sold in total during its lifetime.

Gameplay 

Protector is a two-dimensional side-scrolling shooter game much in the style of Defender set on the surface of Haven-7, where the player controls the Starblade ship as it navigates left or right over the terrain, where the main objective is to destroy alien invaders, while also protecting the inhabitants on the planetoid's landscape from being abducted by the aliens. There are a total of 15 stages, with the progress being kept after completing five stages via the cartridge's EEPROM but high-scores and other settings are not saved. There are also three difficulty levels, however, the game's special edition has a set difficulty and finishing the game unlocks an expert difficulty that can be activated by holding Option on the controller before starting a level. It also features support for the ProController.

Defeating all of the aliens on the level will let the player progress further into the game. If the humans are successfully captured by the alien Landers, they turn into mutants that attack the player's ship. Failing to protect the inhabitants, however, causes the enemies to mutate and no bonus points are granted after completing each stage in this state. Surviving the waves of mutant enemies after completing three levels, will result in the restoration of humans on the planetoid's landscape. Players start with 3 lives to progress through the game and are able to earn more lives by reaching certain score benchmarks. Unlike Defender, the ship has a life bar and can sustain up to three hits until the player is hit one last time by an enemy, an enemy projectile or if a hyperspace jump gets randomly wrong and when all lives are lost, the game is over.

Borrowing from Datastorm are power-ups, which are randomly dropped by enemies as green orbs after being destroyed, ranging from Hyperspace to Protector, which nullifies the alien's ability to abduct humans. New to the game and deviating from Defender'''s gameplay formula are credit power-ups, which act as in-game currency and are randomly dropped as either red-gold or red-silver orbs by destroying enemies, each having different values to buy upgrades and extra lives for the ship in the shop after completing a level and they range in prices. The game also includes a two-player mode, where players complete levels by taking turns to play. In the original version after the game is completed, the player is given a cheat code to use when pausing the game at any time.

 Plot 
On the next century humankind has managed to take their interstellar travel efforts successfully, with interstellar probes capable of entering and exit the Solar System at ease and terraforming is tested on a planetoid named Haven-7, which orbits close to Earth but humankind's success with their probes also caught the attention of an alien swarm that arrives on Earth, resulting in the start of an interstellar war. Although the Earth was prepared to engage in combat with the aliens, Haven-7 was not and the only one spacecraft that was left for their defense is the Starblade, which is assigned to the player to become protector of the minor planet and its inhabitants. After defeating all of the aliens on Haven-7's surface, both mankind and the planet are saved once again.

 Production 
 Background 
Joergen Bech, who previously worked as a developer at Innerprise Software during 1990, decided to work once again as a game programmer after dropping out of international marketing studies in 1994 and landed for the job by one of his contacts who had connection with an employee at Bethesda Softworks, who are best known for The Elder Scrolls and their most recent Fallout titles. Bethesda was interested in expanding their business to video game consoles and Joergen was hired for work on the Jaguar, due to the company receiving free Alpine Development Kits from Atari Corporation and for its superior hardware compared with other systems at the time such as the Sega Genesis and Super NES. 

Bech was originally tasked to make a conversion of a basketball game from PC but decided to create a 2D title in order to understand the Jaguar's hardware, along with another programmer who already was familiarized with the system, after Joergen deemed the PC basketball game as a "steep learning curve" to convert, due to it being in pseudo-3D and being written on C language, which he had little to no experience with them and it was then decided that he should port Protector to Genesis, which was a conversion of Datastorm for Amiga along with the original authors of the game at Bethesda's Media Technology division on Denmark, with him providing the sound driver for the port, but otherwise he was not fully involved with the project and although completed it was ultimately never published due to many console, PC and multimedia titles competing for shelf space, with no prototypes of the Genesis version of Protector being found to date.

 Development and cancellation 

After the Genesis port of Protector was cancelled, Joergen and his team decided to not make a straight conversion of the title to the Jaguar, as the system's graphic and color capabilities far surpassed those found on the Amiga. They also decided to make the game closer to Defender, make enemies and objects small while also restricting it in 2D, with the team spending between four and five months working on the project. Joergen quickly found out difficulties developing for the system's multi-chip architecture but wanted to "make the best use of what the Jaguar had to offer". Protector was developed in assembly language and all the game logic was conducted by the system's Motorola 68000, with the macro assembler, linker, and debugging system tools being provided by BrainStorm. Objects were kept at a small size in order to avoid memory issues with the Object Processor on the system and makes minimal use of parallax scrolling, among other features. The team prioritized in getting the game running at 60 frames per second, while also keeping the number of active on-screen objects low by having one enemy wave active before another one is released but enemy AI was increased to compensate the low number of sprites as a result, while most of the game's graphics and sound effects were sampled from multiple sources and games such as Beach Head II: The Dictator Strikes Back. The cover art for Datastorm was scanned and cropped to be used as the game's title screen. 

By March 1995, Joergen and his team had a mostly complete playable build but the Jaguar itself was in decline and they also learned about the existence of Defender 2000 by Jeff Minter as well, which were the main reasons by Bethesda for cancelling the project, who stopped all development work related to the system and as a result, Joergen Bech walked out from the company the next month. After the project was discontinued, Atari suggested to use the game's engine in a proposed update to the Atari Lynx title Gates of Zendocon for the Jaguar but Christopher Weaver, then-president of Bethesda, was not interested.

 Release Protector was first discussed on DejaNews in 1998, where Carl Forhan of Songbird Productions noticed the post in regards to the game and proceeded to contact Joergen Bech to get the game's source code in order to be finished and published but the rights belonged to Bethesda Softworks. Christopher Weaver, then-president of Bethesda however, agreed to let the company finish the project and publish it, while also picking up the rights to the game in the process. Protector was first released on December 20, 1999.

 Protector: Special Edition 

Announced and showcased at JagFest 2K1, an enhanced version of the game titled Protector: Special Edition was first released on April 30, 2002. Developed by Songbird Productions, it features multiple additions such as new enemies, levels, landscapes and graphics designed by the community, a homebrew program loader, improved gameplay, among other features and changes. It was conceived after Carl Forhan wanted to add more content and improvements to the original version, adding 30% of new code in the title.

 Protector: Resurgence 
First released as a limited special edition run at CGE 2014 and receiving a general release later in the year, an expansion pack for Protector: Special Edition titled Protector: Resurgence was released for the Atari Jaguar CD. It features new levels, graphics, music, gameplay changes and other features for the special edition, which is needed in order to play the expansion via the JagFree CD program included within the game. In addition, it also comes with plastic overlays to use in other Jaguar games such as Robinson's Requiem, Skyhammer and Total Carnage. Likewise, it was also developed by Songbird Productions.

 Reception Protector received positive reviews since its release. Eric Mylonas of GameFan gave a positive outlook to the game, remarking that "While i'm not going to tell you it's a 'gotta have it' kind of game, it still makes a pretty cool collector's item and a solid game in its own right". Bruce Clarke of The Atari Times also gave a positive review to the game, praising the graphics, controls, music and sound effects but criticized the unbalanced difficulty levels and the lack of variety in both the backgrounds and foregrounds but stated that he was "very pleased with Protector, and would rate it as one of the better games for the Jaguar. I don't think it's quite at the level of Tempest 2000 or Doom, but it is pretty close".

David Bowen from Defunct Game praised the game's graphics, speed and controls, while criticizing the music and difficulty level but he remarked that "Protector is a great new addition to the slowly growing library of Jaguar games, and anyone who likes shooters and wants to try a defender style game that focuses more on game play and action rather than flashy graphics then this is your choice". The game also received a perfect score by Ralph Karels from German magazine Video Games''.

References

External links 
 
 Protector at AtariAge
 Protector at GameFAQs
 Protector at MobyGames

1999 video games
Atari Jaguar games
Atari Jaguar CD games
Atari Jaguar-only games
Bethesda Softworks games
Cancelled Sega Genesis games
Horizontally scrolling shooters
Multiplayer and single-player video games
Songbird Productions games
Video games developed in the United States
Video games set in outer space
Video games set on fictional planets
Video games with expansion packs